New Polzeath (meaning new Polzeath) is a coastal settlement immediately north-east of Polzeath in north Cornwall, England, United Kingdom.

The main street in New Polzeath is Atlantic Terrace which faces across the bay. The terrace was built in 1898. The area of New Polzeath inland of the terrace was developed later. An estate of holiday homes was built in the last few years. The National Trust owns land to the west and north of New Polzeath and this curtails further development.

New Polzeath has access to Polzeath beach at low water; there is also access to Pentireglaze beach, a smaller beach.

The road to New Polzeath connects with the road into Polzeath over a mile east of the villages so although the places are contiguous, driving between them means a  trip. Alternatively a coast path of approximately  links the two places.

Just beyond the Point, facing Rumps Point, is a plaque commemorating the place where Laurence Binyon, in 1914, composed his famous poem For the Fallen incorporating the Ode of Remembrance.

The former Roman Catholic Archbishop of Westminster, Cardinal Bernard Griffin, died suddenly in office of a heart attack while holidaying here in August 1956. His death occurred in the Diocese of Plymouth, under which Cornwall and the Isles of Scilly fall.

References

External links

Villages in Cornwall
Beaches of Cornwall
Populated coastal places in Cornwall